Abdul Latif Rashid (born 10 August 1944), also known as Latif Rashid is an Iraqi Kurdish politician and the ninth president of Iraq, following the 2022 Iraqi presidential election. He was previously the Minister of Water Resources under the government of Nouri al-Maliki. Prior to that, he served in the same position under both the Iraqi Transitional Government and the Iraqi Interim Government. Rashid was formerly a spokesperson for the Patriotic Union of Kurdistan (PUK) in the United Kingdom.

As Minister for Water Resources from September 2003 until December 2010, Rashid was responsible for a range of issues, including irrigation, municipal and industrial water supply, hydropower, flood control, and environmental requirements including marsh restoration.

Early life and education 
Rashid was born in 1944 in Sulaymaniyah, Kurdistan, Kingdom of Iraq, to an upper-class Kurdish family. Rashid took British A-Levels in North Wales. He has a B.Sc. (1968) in Civil Engineering from Liverpool University, and an M.Sc. (1973) and Ph.D. (1978) in Engineering from Manchester University. After having graduated from Liverpool University he became a lecturer at the University of Sulaymaniah in 1969. Upon returning to Iraq, he became an active member of the PUK under the leadership of Jalal Talabani, his brother-in-law.

Professional career 

Rashid has been involved with a number of programs and organizations related to engineering, agriculture developments. He previously worked as senior Project Manager for the UN's Food and Agriculture Organization (UNFAO) in Yemen and Saudi Arabia. He was a member of Executive Council of the Iraqi National Congress (INC) and the Patriotic Union of Kurdistan's Representative in the UK since 1986 as well as spokesman for the Kurdistan Front.

Rashid is a chartered engineer, a fellow of the Institution of Civil Engineering and the International Commission on Irrigation and Drainage (ICID). He has been a freelance consultant for irrigation and drainage projects and worked with the Water Engineering Administration.
 
In 1992, Rashid was elected vice president and Executive Member of the Iraqi National Congress (INC), and in 1998 he was elected to the six-member leadership of the INC.

Political career 
Apart from technical qualifications and engagements Rashid has taken an active part in both Kurdish and Iraqi politics. In 1986 he became the spokesman for the PUK in the United Kingdom.  He has attended many conferences and official meetings on behalf of Kurdish political parties and Iraqi opposition groups during Saddam's regime. Rashid has also represented Kurdish politics and Iraqi opposition groups to Saddam in official meetings with various international institutions and governments. In 2003 he became the minister of water resources, a post he kept until 2010. He served as a presidential adviser since 2010.

President of Iraq 
On 13 October 2022, Rashid was elected as the ninth President of Iraq. Rashid replaced Barham Salih as head of state after the two-round vote in parliament, winning more than 162 votes against 99 for Salih.

Foreign policy 
Rashid is aware of the importance of the economic ties between Turkey and Iraq but also opposed the normalization of the diplomatic relations as long as Turkey violates Iraqs sovereignty.

Personal life 
He is married to Shanaz Ibrahim Ahmed and they are the parents to three children.

References

Government ministers of Iraq
Living people
Iraqi Muslims
1944 births
Iraqi civil engineers
Patriotic Union of Kurdistan politicians
Iraqi National Congress politicians
Presidents of Iraq